The Age of Nero is the seventh studio album by black metal band Satyricon. It was released on 3 November 2008, through Roadrunner Records. The release was backed by a full European headlining tour opening in Stavanger, Norway on 12 November and ending in Hamburg, Germany on 20 December.

Background 
Most of the album was written in a forest cabin, with the collaboration of Snorre Ruch (Thorns). It was recorded in part at Sound City Studios in Van Nuys, California, the place where Metallica had recorded Death Magnetic and most famously, where Nirvana had recorded Nevermind. 

On 6 October 2008, the first single, "Black Crow on a Tombstone", was released for online streaming at Roadrunner Records' UK website.

Track listing

Personnel

Satyricon 
 Satyr (Sigurd Wongraven) – vocals, guitars, keyboards, effects, arrangement, production
 Frost (Kjetil-Vidar Haraldstad) – drums

Additional personnel 
 Snorre Ruch – guitars
 Windhfyr – keyboards, choir on tracks 1-4
 Erik Ljunggren – additional effects
 Victor Brandt – bass guitar
 Eirik Devold, Terje Midtgård, Øivind Westby – trombone
 Thomas Røisland – tuba
 Andrew John Smith, Arild Rohde, Bjørn Bugge, Christian Lyder Marstrander, Kjell Viig, Sturla Flem Rinvik – choir on tracks 1-4

Production 
 Snorre Ruch – arrangement
 Joe Barresi – engineering, mixing
 Josh Smith, Lars Klokkerhuag, Erik Ljunggren, Rail Jon Rogut – engineers
 Jun Murakawa – mixing assistance
 Brian Gardner – mastering

Charts

References 

2008 albums
Satyricon (band) albums
Albums recorded at Sound City Studios